Arthur Freeman (17 September 1887 – 15 September 1973) was an Australian rules footballer who played for the Collingwood Football Club, Fitzroy Football Club and Essendon Football Club in the Victorian Football League (VFL).

References

External links 

Artie Freeman's profile at Collingwood Forever

1887 births
1973 deaths
Australian rules footballers from Victoria (Australia)
Collingwood Football Club players
Fitzroy Football Club players
Essendon Football Club players
People from Bairnsdale